Tradipitant (VLY-686 or LY686017) is an experimental drug that is a neurokinin 1 antagonist. It works by blocking substance P, a small signaling molecule. Originally, this compound was owned by Eli Lilly and named LY686017. VLY-686 was purchased by Vanda Pharmaceuticals from Eli Lilly and Company in 2012. Vanda Pharmaceuticals is a U.S. pharmaceutical company that as of November 2015 only has three drugs in their product pipeline: tasimelteon, VLY-686, and iloperidone.

Indications

Pruritus 
It is being investigated by Vanda Pharmaceuticals for chronic pruritus (itchiness) in atopic dermatitis. In March 2015, Vanda announced positive results from a Phase II proof of concept study. A proof of concept study is done in early stage clinical trials after there have been promising preclinical results. It provides preliminary evidence that the drug is active in humans and has some efficacy.

Alcoholism 
VLY-686 reduced alcohol craving in recently detoxified alcoholic patients as measured by the Alcohol Urge Questionnaire. In a placebo controlled clinical trial of recently detoxified alcoholic patients, VLY-686 significantly reduced alcohol craving as measured by the Alcohol Urge Questionnaire. It also reduced the cortisol increase seen after a stress test compared to placebo. The dose given was 50 mg per day.

Social anxiety disorder
In a 12-week randomized trial of LY68017 in 189 patients with social anxiety disorder, 50 mg of LY68017 did not provide any statistically significant improvement over placebo.

Gastroparesis
Tradipitant underwent phase II clinical trials assessing its utility in the treatment of gastroparesis the results of which were announced on December 3rd, 2018.  In a study performed over 4 weeks with a patient population of 141 patients, Tradipitant met its primary endpoint of decreased nausea scores as recorded in daily patient diaries. It also showed a statistically significant improvement in nausea-free days, and key gastroparesis scales.

References 

NK1 receptor antagonists
Triazoles
Trifluoromethyl compounds
Pyridines